Pushkinskaya Street is one of the main streets in Rostov-on-Don. The street is named after the Russian poet Alexander Pushkin. Many old houses, university buildings, and the Don State Public Library are located on this street. The Pushkinskaya Street is a green boulevard, it goes parallel to the Don River.

History 
The street was constructed in the second half of the 19th century and was originally named Kuznetskaya (Blacksmith). In 1885, it was named Pushkinskaya in honor of the great Russian poet Alexander Pushkin, who visited Rostov-on-Don several times.

At the beginning of the 20th century Pushkinskaya Street became the second most important after the Bolshaya Sadovaya Street. In 1904 electric streetlights appeared on the street. The houses on the street were built by the best architects of the city.

In 1959 the Monument to Alexander Pushkin was erected on the street.

Notable buildings and structures

References

Bibliography 
 Волошинова Л. Ф. Пушкинская улица. — Ростов-на-Дону: «Донской издательский дом», 2000. — .

Streets in Rostov-on-Don